Amirabad-e Sorkh Mahalleh (also Romanized as Amīrābād-e Sorkh Maḩalleh; also known as Sorkh Maḩalleh) is a village in Zarrin Gol Rural District, in the Central District of Aliabad County, Golestan Province, Iran. At the 2006 census, its population was 2,340, in 482 families.

References 

Populated places in Aliabad County